Icelandic referendum can refer to:

 Icelandic prohibition referendum, 1908
 Icelandic community service referendum, 1916
 Icelandic sovereignty referendum, 1918 
 Icelandic prohibition referendum, 1933
 Icelandic constitutional referendum, 1944 
 Icelandic loan guarantees referendum, 2010
 Icelandic loan guarantees referendum, 2011
 Icelandic constitutional referendum, 2012